Shahanara Begum is a Jatiya Party (Ershad) politician and the former Member of Parliament from a reserved seat.

Early life
Begum was born on 29 May 1940 and she has B.A. and B.Ed. degrees.

Career
Begum was elected to parliament from reserved seat as a Jatiya Party (Ershad) candidate in 2014.

References

Jatiya Party politicians
Living people
1940 births
Women members of the Jatiya Sangsad
10th Jatiya Sangsad members
21st-century Bangladeshi women politicians
21st-century Bangladeshi politicians